Dallas County High School is a public high school in Plantersville, Alabama, United States.

Building history
In the late 19th century Plantersville had its own college, founded by and chartered under John L. Dodson LL.D., who had formerly been president of Oxford College at Oxford, Alabama.  Dallas County High School of Plantersville finally came into existence in 1909 and absorbed the facilities of Plantersville College.

Dallas County High School was the oldest public high school building in existence until fire destroyed the main building on April 19, 1982.  Arson was suspected and many of the community mourned the loss of the building and also old records, trophies and other memorabilia.  The school building was reopened by the fall of 1983 and restored to its original antebellum style architecture.
Along with the new main building, there are additions to the campus, with the 9th grade Success Academy and two gymnasiums, one being used for the basketball and the volleyball teams.

Notable alumni 
Michael Johnson- Football, defensive end for the Cincinnati Bengals

References

External links 
 

Educational institutions established in 1908
Public high schools in Alabama
Schools in Dallas County, Alabama
1908 establishments in Alabama